Charles Howell Porter (June 21, 1833 – July 9, 1897) was an attorney and politician who served as a U.S. Representative from Virginia.

Born and raised in Cairo, New York, he earned his law degree in Albany and set up a practice. in 1861, with the outbreak of the American Civil War, he joined a New York volunteer unit.

He settled in Norfolk, Virginia during the war and made his career there.

Biography
Born in Cairo, New York, Porter completed preparatory studies.
He was graduated from the law university at Albany, New York, in 1853.
He was admitted to the bar in 1854 and commenced practice in Ashland, New York.
He entered the Union Army in 1861 as a member of the 1st Regiment New York Mounted Rifles.

He settled in Norfolk, Virginia during the war.
He served as city attorney for one year, and as
Commonwealth attorney from 1863–1867. He moved to the state  capital, Richmond, in 1867.

He served as member of the Virginia Constitutional Convention of 1868.
Upon the readmission of Virginia to the US, Porter was elected as a Republican to the Forty-first and Forty-second Congresses, serving from January 26, 1870, to March 3, 1873.

He declined to be a candidate for renomination in 1872.
He engaged in the practice of law in New York City and Beacon, New York.

He died in Cairo, New York, July 9, 1897. He was interred in Cairo Cemetery.

Electoral history

1869; Porter was elected to the U.S. House of Representatives with 77.16% of the vote, defeating Independents James W. Hunnicutt and John E. Mulford.
1870; Porter was re-elected unopposed.

References

External links

 

1833 births
1897 deaths
Union Army personnel
People of New York (state) in the American Civil War
People from Cairo, New York
Republican Party members of the United States House of Representatives from Virginia
19th-century American politicians